Bombing of Frankfurt am Main by the Allies of World War II killed about 5,500 residents and destroyed the largest half-timbered historical city centre in Germany (the Eighth Air Force dropped 12,197 tons of explosives on the city).

In the 1939–45 period the Royal Air Force (RAF) dropped 15,696 long tons of bombs on Frankfurt.

Post-war reconstruction generally used modern architecture, and a few landmark buildings were rebuilt in a simple historical style.  The 1st building rebuilt was the 1789 Paulskirche (St. Paul's Church).

See also
Post-war reconstruction of Frankfurt.

References

History of Frankfurt
Frankfurt
World War II strategic bombing lists
20th century in Frankfurt
Frankfurt
Germany–United Kingdom military relations
Germany–United States military relations
1940s in Hesse